Eleonora Maria "Ellen" van Dijk (born 11 February 1987) is a Dutch professional road racing cyclist, who currently rides for UCI Women's WorldTeam . Besides road cycling she was also a track cyclist until 2012. Van Dijk is known as a time trial specialist and is five times world champion. She won her first world title on the track in the scratch race in 2008. She became Road World Champion in 2012, 2013 and 2016 with her respective trade teams in the team time trial and in 2013 also in the individual time trial. In 2015, she won the time trial at the first European Games and the silver medal in the team time trial at the world championships.

Van Dijk started as a speed skater and as part of her skating training she undertook cycling as part of cross-training in summer. She excelled at both, competing nationally at junior level. She gave up speed skating and switched to cycling full-time after winning the national cycling championship for the fifth time in 2007. Along with her world title successes, Van Dijk has also twice been European track champion, three times European time trial champion and has won six World Cup races. In 2012, she competed in three disciplines at the 2012 Olympic Games in London, where she helped Marianne Vos win the gold medal in the road race, finished eighth in the time trial and sixth in the team pursuit.

Personal life 

Ellen van Dijk grew up in Harmelen, Utrecht together with her two older brothers along with her mother and father. Besides speed skating and cycling, she also played volleyball and performed gymnastics when she was a child. Van Dijk left Harmelen for her study to Amsterdam in 2006, where she still lives. During the first years in Amsterdam she shared her apartment with Mariëlle Kerste, her best friend and also a Dutch cyclist. Kerste moved out a few years later and Van Dijk has since shared an apartment with the Dutch cyclist Hannah Walter. In December 2014 Van Dijk moved to Woerden.

Van Dijk graduated from Minkema College, Woerden, in 2005 and earned a bachelor's degree in Human Movement Sciences at the Vrije Universiteit Amsterdam in 2011. After the Olympics she started her master's degree, but didn't have time to complete it.

Sport career

Speed skating 
Van Dijk started her career as a speed skater. As a very young child, she had performed in natural ice skating tours and, at the age of eight, she became a member of a local speed skating club. During the winter months, Van Dijk trained almost every day at the local speed skating rink in Utrecht. She did this from when she was aged twelve until she was twenty years old. Van Dijk competed five times in the junior Dutch Allround Championships; she finished in tenth place on two occasions in the all-around competition and in fourth place in the 3000m in 2005. She also rode the track record at the 5000 metres.

Early cycling years 

When she was ten years old, Van Dijk started, together with her two brothers and Mariëlle Kerste, cross-training on a bike during the summer and she began competing in regional races. Because Van Dijk performed well, she started competing in national races at the age of 15 in 2002. In the same year, in her first national championship, she finished in fourth place. The following year, she won the Dutch national road championship in the novice category. In 2004, Van Dijk won two more national titles, this time as a junior, in the road race and in the road individual time trial. In the latter, she beat Marianne Vos, though Vos would avenge her defeat in Road World Championships in Verona, Italy. Vos won the junior road race world title, with Van Dijk finishing third. In 2005, Van Dijk again won the Dutch national junior title in the individual time trial but finished second in the road race, again behind Vos. In 2007, when Van Dijk was considered for selection in regional speed skating, she had to choose between speed skating and cycling– ultimately, she chose cycling.

Professional career

2006 

Van Dijk achieved two stage victories in the Tour Féminin en Limousin and in the Giro della Toscana. In the middle of the season, Van Dijk suffered a clavicle fracture and as a result was hampered in the national championships. She finished 10th at the U-23 European Championships in Valkenburg and at the World University Cycling Championship, Van Dijk won the individual time trial and finished second in the road race. At the end of the season, Van Dijk was a reserve at the road world championships but she did not race. At the Dutch National Track Championships she won bronze in the individual pursuit.

2007 

Van Dijk won the first stage in the Tour of Chongming Island and finished second in the general classification. At the national time trial championships she became for the first time Dutch champion in the elite category. In the time trial at the European Championships (under-23) she finished fifth. Due to her good results in the time trials she was chosen to represent the Netherlands in the time trial at the Road World Championships in Stuttgart where she finished 17th. Due to her good results she became sportswomen of the year of Woerden. Because Van Dijk had more spare time in the winter after quitting speed skating, she was invited to join the Dutch national track cycling team. At the national track championships she became Dutch champion in the individual pursuit, ahead of Marianne Vos and Kirsten Wild, and finished fourth in the scratch race and points race.

2008 

Due to her good results at the national track cycling championships, Van Dijk was chosen to ride the individual pursuit in the remaining two (out of four) 2007–2008 track cycling World Cups, where she could, via the UCI World Ranking system, potentially earn qualification for the 2008 Olympic Games. She finished in Los Angeles and Copenhagen in fifth and fourth places respectively. After finishing fifth in the individual pursuit at the World Track Championships in Manchester, Van Dijk missed out on qualification for the Olympic Games; she finished 12th in the UCI World Rankings and only the first eleven riders qualified. The day after she took revenge by winning her first major senior title, the scratch race at the 2008 World Cycling Championships. With eight laps to go she attacked and rode solo to the finish line. Later that year, she also became European Track Championships in the scratch as well as in the points race. She rode to the silver medal in the omnium and the individual pursuit events.
Despite not winning a medal at the Dutch time trial championships she won the time trial at the European Championships (under-23). She was not selected to ride the time trial at the Summer Olympics, because the course would be too heavy for her.

2009 

On the track, Van Dijk followed other competitors by riding with a heavier gear. The change seemed to bear fruit when, in February at the Track Cycling World Cup in Copenhagen, she won her first two World Cup victories in the individual pursuit and points race and won a silver medal in the team pursuit. A month later at the Track Cycling World Championships in Pruszków, Poland, she failed to live up to her billing as world champion and her performances were not as good as those than in Copenhagen in February and in Manchester the year before. Indeed, Van Dijk did not reach the podium in any event. In spite of her disappointing performance in Pruszków, Van Dijk was approached by, and soon agreed to join, the professional road cycling team . Although the name of the team has changed on a number of occasions since, Van Dijk rode for this team until 2013. The road season did not start well as Van Dijk suffered a concussion in a crash during the Ronde van Gelderland in April and she was unable to ride for nearly six weeks. Almost immediately after having recovered from her injury, she defended successfully her European time trial title at the European Road Championships in July. After riding the time trial at the Road World Championships, Van Dijk took some rest in preparation for the Track Cycling World Cups. She skipped the National track championships, which were held two weeks after the World Championships.

2010 

Van Dijk did not reach the finals at the Track Cycling World Championships in Melbourne, finishing fifth in both the individual pursuit and the team pursuit events. She also participated in the points race as a late replacement and finished eighth. Van Dijk won the time trial on the road in the Holland Ladies Tour en route to finishing third in the final general classification standings. She won the Sparkassen Giro and finished second in the Open de Suède Vårgårda World Cup race in Sweden. At the Dutch Track Championships, Van Dijk won five medals including gold in the individual pursuit.

2011 

Van Dijk cycled in the team pursuit to a national team time trial record at the Track Cycling World Cup in Manchester. A month later however she rode with the team three seconds slower at the Track Cycling World Championships and finished in 5th place; the same position in which Van Dijk finished in the individual pursuit.

Van Dijk started the road cycling season by winning all three classifications (yellow jersey, points and young rider) in the Ladies Tour of Qatar, including winning the second stage. Van Dijk dedicated her stage and overall win to teammate Carla Swart, who died whilst training after being hit by a truck a few weeks earlier. The prize money she earned in Qatar was sent to her family. After riding stage races in the Netherlands, China and Spain she finished second at the Dutch time trial championships in Veendam and qualified for the World Championships later the year. A month later, in Sweden, she rode two World Cup races, winning the Open de Suède Vårgårda TTT and finishing second in the Open de Suède Vårgårda. As preparation for the World Championships she won the time trial at the Holland Ladies Tour. At the World Championships in Copenhagen she finished 6th in the time trial and was the best Dutch rider. Returning to the track, Van Dijk won the Track Cycling World Cup in Astana in a new national record, which was her fourth World Cup victory. At the end of the year she successfully defended her Dutch individual pursuit title at the Dutch National Track Championships and also became national champion in the madison.

2012 

After a knee injury due to an accident with a scooter and a few weeks of required rest and adjusted training, Van Dijk won a stage in the Energiewacht Tour; because she did not earn enough bonus seconds during the tour she finished second in the general classification. Van Dijk also won the individual time trial and the road race in the Omloop van Borsele. A few days later she started in the Gracia–Orlová, where she won the prologue and a stage and helped her teammate Evelyn Stevens to win the general classification. Back in the Netherlands, in Emmen, she became the Dutch time trial champion in the elite category for the second time in her career.

Van Dijk was selected to represent her country at the Olympic Games in London, and she competed in the road race and the individual time trial on the road and in the team pursuit on the track. In the road race, Van Dijk was a domestique for Marianne Vos, who won the gold medal. Van Dijk attacked five times but finished outside the time limit. Because the victory of Marianne Vos was seen as a team performance, Van Dijk, Loes Gunnewijk and Annemiek van Vleuten were all subsequently honoured in both the Holland Heineken House and the Ridderzaal. In the time trial, Van Dijk finished eighth. She said afterwards that she was afraid to start too fast and subsequently lost a lot of time in the first part of the race. In the team pursuit, Van Dijk finished sixth together with Kirsten Wild, Amy Pieters and Vera Koedooder. In the qualification heats, the team had held the Olympic record for a short period and they rode a new Dutch national record in round one. According to Van Dijk, sixth place was the highest attainable place the team could have hoped to achieve.

As preparation for the Road World Championships, Van Dijk and her  won the team time trials at the World Cup (Vårgårda) and in the Holland Ladies Tour. In between these victories, Van Dijk won the first and final stages of the Lotto–Decca Tour and as a result also topped the general classification, finishing ahead of Kirsten Wild in second place. Three days later, Van Dijk finished fifth in the individual time trial on a hilly course that she afterwards described as being "not made for me". During the winter period she chose not to ride on the track to keep her focus completely on the 2013 road cycling season.

2013 

Van Dijk started the season with a third place in the general classification of the Ladies Tour of Qatar. During the season openers Van Dijk rode very well highlighted by her victory in the Le Samyn des Dames. In the first three UCI World Cup races Van Dijk finished two times second (Ronde van Drenthe, Tour of Flanders) and rode to a third place in the Trofeo Alfredo Binda in Italy. Her second stage race of the season, the Energiewacht Tour included the first individual time trial of the season which she won with a big difference. After also finishing two times second she won the general classification. About the time trial she said later that she had been tested on her time trial position during her stay in Italy . After a day of testing and adjusting the position of the saddle and the steer she found a better position which she was able to maintain for almost half an hour. She also said that she rode at a higher power than in the time trials at the 2012 Summer Olympics and the 2012 World Championships. Van Dijk also improved riding uphill and finished sixt in the fourth World Cup race, the hilly La Flèche Wallonne. Her time trial continued to go well and she won the time trials at the EPZ Omloop van Borsele and two time trial stages in the Gracia–Orlová. She also won a mountain stage, the queen stage, in the Gracia–Orlová and so the general classification. In June she successfully defended her National Time Trial title in Winsum. A few days later she rode in medal position during the National Road Race Championships but had to abandon the race due to a broken derailleur in the second last lap. At the Giro d'Italia Femminile, the most prestigious stage race in women's cycling, she won stage 8, an individual time trial. With  she won World Cup team time trial at the Open de Suède Vårgårda TTT. After the last two World Cup races, the Open de Suède Vårgårda where she finished fourth and the GP de Plouay which she did not ride to prepare for the last stage races, she finished third in the overall World Cup standings. She rode strong during the stage races and won the general classification of the Belgium Tour as well as of the Holland Ladies Tour, including the team time trial stages.

As a preparation for the World Championships in Tuscany Van Dijk went during the season a few times to Italy to practise the time trial course. She trained at five in the morning to avoid traffic and made video recordings of the course to get to know the turns. In the week before the World Championships she won the French time trial Chrono Champenois – Trophée Européen. All the preparations paid off and the World Championships were very successful for Van Dijk. With her team she won for the second consecutive year the world title in the team time trial. Because Van Dijk had won almost all the time trials this year she was also the main favourite for the individual time trial. Despite the pressure she won the time trial with a convincing victory and became the second Dutch women to win this title. At the end of the championships, Van Dijk finished 16th on a non-preferable hilly road race course.

Due to her successful season she ended third in the 2013 Women's Road World Ranking. At the end of the year Van Dijk won the title Amsterdam Sportswoman of the year. She was nominated previous years but never won the title. She was also nominated to become Dutch cyclist of the year but lost from Marianne Vos.

2014 

The time trial at the 2016 Summer Olympics was her big goal, and keeping her focus on time trials, world cup races and flat short stage races. Due to her focus on road cycling, she stopped competing on the track. Van Dijk was not able to start in the Ladies Tour of Qatar because she did not recover in time from an illness after riding mountainbikerace Egmond-pier-Egmond. She got back her shape during the first races and just missed the podium in the GP Le Samyn. At the first World Cup race of the season, the Ronde van Drenthe, Van Dijk helped teammate Lizzie Armitstead to victory by closing a massive gap in the final part of the race.

Van Dijk won the Tour of Flanders after a solo of 25 kilometres in April. After her time trial victory at the World Championships in 2013, it is her major victory of her career according to herself. At the end of April, Ellen van Dijk won for the third consecutive the time trial at the Omloop van Borsele. The day afterwards Van Dijk finished third in the road race which ended with a bunch sprint. As part of the same time trial competition, Van Dijk did not win the time trial at the GP Leende a month later. She finished second behind former teammate Lisa Brennauer. Van Dijk responded that here average power during the time trial was not great but also not very bad and that Brennauer is a world class time trialist. Two days later she finished again second in the prologue of the  Elsy Jacobs stage race, two seconds behind Marianne Vos.

At the Boels Rental Hills Classic Van Dijk was part of front group that consisted of six riders which fell apart into a group of three riders. With an uphill finish, Van Dijk lost the sprint from Johansson (Orica–AIS) and finished second ahead of Amy Pieters (Rabo Liv). Van Dijk won the mountain classification of the race. In June, Van Dijk started as the main favourite at the Dutch National Time Trial Championships, but did not win her fourth time trial title. She finished second, with a margin of only 0.02 seconds, behind Annemiek van Vleuten (Rabo Liv). Van Dijk was disappointed and responded that she was not that good as in 2013 without having a real explanation for it.

Van Dijk participated at La Course by Le Tour de France, the inaugural edition of a women's race on the final day and on the same circuit of the Tour de France with worldwide broadcasting. Van Dijk attacked multiple times and was the only women who was able to get clear for a few laps with a maximal advantage of over half a minute. At the Open de Suède Vårgårda TTT, where she finished third with her team, she got some confidence back about her time trial performances. In begin September Van Dijk won the time trial of the Boels Rental Ladies Tour, with a 12 seconds gap over her main rival Lisa Brennauer. Her first international time trial victory of the season. With the other stages ending in a bunch sprint and sprinters winning the bonification seconds, Van Dijk finished third in the general classification. A final test for het time trial capabilities before the World Championships was at the Chrono Champenois ITT. Halfway the  time trial she had a 39 seconds advantage over Hanna Solovey, but she finished second 8 seconds behind her because she lost about a minute after riding the wrong direction.

2015 

Van Dijk started the season as usual with the Ladies Tour of Qatar. She won the second stage and took the lead in the general classification. The day afterwards teammate Lizzie Armitstead took over the leading jersey. Van Dijk ended the tour in third place in the overall classification. During the first European race of the season, the Omloop het Nieuwsblad, van Dijk escaped from a front group of 15 riders on the Molenberg with 30 km to go. Anna van der Breggen was the only one who was able to follow her. The duo extended their advantage over the cobbled sections that followed, holding off the chase group to the line, where Van Dijk lost the two-up sprint. A few days later Van Dijk rode again strong in the Le Samyn des Dames. In the final kilometers she closed a one-minute gap with the front group. After closing the gap she was the leadout for Chantal Blaak who sprinted to victory. Due to a back injury, Van Dijk could not start in Omloop van het Hageland. In the first World Cup of the season, the Ronde van Drenthe, the team was eager to win. In the final Van Dijk was the lead-out for Armitstead. However, Armitstead lost Van Dijk in the last kilometer. Van Dijk continued sprinting and rode to the third place. She was happy with her result, but found it a shame that the team did not win. During the second World Cup race, the Trofeo Alfredo Bina Van Dijk couldn't ride uphill with the fastest riders and finished eighth, with teammate Armitstead taking the win. For the Tour of Flanders, Van Dijk heard a day before the race  she was not as a leader of the team, although Van Dijk won this World Cup race previous year. Because Van Dijk prepared very well for this race she was disappointed, and didn't ride a good race finishing 24th. Van Dijk rode several races in the Netherlands, Belgium and Spain in April, May and the begin of the June. The most notable results from these race being a second place in the team time trial in the Energiewacht Tour and a second place in Gooik–Geraardsbergen–Gooik, being outsprinted by Gracie Elvin.
Van Dijk was selected to represent the Netherlands at the first 2015 European Games in the time trial and the road race in Baku, Azerbaijan in June. The time trial was her big goal and she was the favorite to win it. With a good race over the straight circuit she was 36 seconds faster than the Ukrainian Hanna Solovey and won the first gold medal for the Netherlands. In the road race she was part of front group of four riders, together with countrywomen Anna van der Breggen. During the last lap it appeared that Van der Breggen rode for her Polish trade-teammate Katarzyna Niewiadoma and not for the Netherlands. Van Dijk was the brunt of these tactics and finished fourth.  Four days later, back in the Netherlands, she was not able to win the national time trial championships, finishing almost half a minute behind Van der Breggen.

During the La Course by Le Tour de France the rain poured down and made the course and cobbles slippery. Van Dijk was involved by one of the many crashes. She broke het collarbone and had to abandon the race. At home she had installed a high-altitude tent, and with a speedy recovery she went with Iris Slappendel to Switzerland to train at high altitude. Six weeks after her crash she could race again and started in the 2015 Boels Rental Ladies Tour on 1 September. She rode in the stage race stronger every day and finished second in the time trial, two seconds behind of Lisa Brennauer. She moved to the third place in the general classification and was able to keep this position.

At the 2015 UCI Road World Championships in Richmond, United States, she won the silver medal with her team in the team time trial. In the  time trial she finished disappointingly seventh. A reason for her performance was that her rear wheal was not well attached in the frame. Her wheel ran into the frame, damaging her tire and puncturing her inner tube. For the road race she rode for Anna van der Breggen who won the silver medal and finished in tenth place herself.

2016 

Van Dijk started the road race season also this year with the Ladies Tour of Qatar. It was very windy and Van Dijk lost some time in the second stage because she rode in the second echelon. In the third stage she was part of the front group. In the last few kilometres she was able to ride away and won the stage, in the same city as she won the year before. She moved up to the third place in the general classification and maintained this position, with teammate Romy Kasper finishing in second place overall. At the Omloop het Nieuwsblad at the end of February, Van Dijk attacked at the last climb. She was caught and finished the race in arrears due to a bike change. Due to a crash during the race she went to the hospital afterwards and it appears she had one broken and some bruised ribs. She was not able to race for several weeks and returned in the women's peloton mid March. Van Dijk had a very successful Energiewacht Tour. With her team she won the team time trial first stage. During the early sprint finished she was able to didn't loose any time. After winning the time trial of stage 4b she led the general classification. Van Dijk didn't give away her advantage in the last stage, and so she won after 2013 for the second time the Energiewacht Tour. After racing more international races from April to May the first championships of the season was the 2016 Dutch national time trial championships. However, due to a back injury she was not able to start. In the road race of the national championships a few days later she was not able win from the  who played it smart with their large number of riders. In July she won the time trial of the Thüringen Rundfahrt stage race, beating national champion Annemiek van Vleuten. For two stages she led the general classification but was not able to keep the yellow jersey after a breakaway of two riders got a too large advantage.

2022 
In April 2022 van Dijk announced that she would try to break the hour record on 23 May in Grenchen, Switzerland.

Career achievements

Major results

Road

2004
 3rd  Road race, UCI World Junior Championships
2005
 7th Road race, UCI World Junior Championships
2006
 World University Championships
1st  Road race
2nd  Time trial
 1st Stage 1 (ITT) Giro della Toscana
 5th Overall Tour Féminin en Limousin
1st Stage 2
 6th Lowland International Rotterdam Tour
2007
 1st  Time trial, National Championships
 1st Profronde van Stiphout
 2nd Overall Tour of Chongming Island Stage race
1st Stage 1
 3rd Omloop van Borsele
 3rd Tour of Chongming Island Time trial
 5th Time trial, UEC European Under-23 Championships
 5th Chrono Champenois – Trophée Européen
 6th Omloop Het Volk
 7th Novilon Internationale Damesronde van Drenthe
 7th Sparkassen Giro
2008
 1st  Time trial, UEC European Under-23 Championships
 Tour de l'Aude
1st  Young rider classification
1st Stage 2 (TTT)
 1st Stage 1 (ITT) Tour Féminin en Limousin
 3rd Overall Ster Zeeuwsche Eilanden
 7th Chrono Champenois – Trophée Européen
2009
 1st  Time trial, UEC European Under-23 Championships
 1st Stage 1 (ITT) Giro della Toscana
 1st Stage 2 (ITT) Holland Ladies Tour
 2nd Open de Suède Vårgårda TTT
 3rd Time trial, National Championships
 4th Overall Tour of Qatar
1st  Young rider classification
2010
 1st Sparkassen Giro
 2nd Open de Suède Vårgårda TTT
 3rd Overall Holland Ladies Tour
1st Stage 6 (ITT)
 5th Omloop van Borsele
 5th Open de Suède Vårgårda
 6th Ronde van Gelderland
 6th Tour of Chongming Island World Cup
 7th Chrono Champenois – Trophée Européen
 9th GP Stad Roeselare
 10th Novilon Eurocup Ronde van Drenthe
2011
 1st  Overall Tour of Qatar
1st  Points classification
1st  Young rider classification
1st Stage 2
 1st Open de Suède Vårgårda TTT
 1st Stage 2 (ITT) Holland Ladies Tour
 2nd Time trial, National Championships
 2nd Open de Suède Vårgårda
 5th 7-Dorpenomloop Aalburg
 6th Time trial, UCI World Championships
2012
 UCI World Championships
1st  Team time trial
5th Time trial
 1st  Time trial, National Championships
 1st  Overall Belgium Tour
1st Stage 3
 1st Time trial, EPZ Omloop van Borsele
 1st Open de Suède Vårgårda TTT
 1st Stage 1 (TTT) Holland Ladies Tour
 2nd Overall Energiewacht Tour
1st Stage 4b (TTT)
 2nd Omloop Het Nieuwsblad
 4th Overall Tour of Qatar
 6th Overall Gracia Orlová
1st Prologue & Stage 2 (ITT)
 6th Tour of Flanders
 8th Time trial, Olympic Games
 10th Durango-Durango Emakumeen Saria
2013
 UCI World Championships
1st  Time trial
1st  Team time trial
 1st  Time trial, National Championships
 1st  Overall Gracia–Orlová
1st  Points classification
1st Prologue, Stages 2 (ITT) & 4
 1st  Overall Energiewacht Tour
1st Stage 3a (ITT)
 1st  Overall Belgium Tour
1st Stage 1 (TTT)
 1st  Overall Holland Ladies Tour
1st Stage 2 (TTT)
 1st Time trial, EPZ Omloop van Borsele
 1st Le Samyn des Dames
 1st Open de Suède Vårgårda TTT
 1st Chrono Champenois
 1st Stage 8 (ITT) Giro Rosa
 2nd Ronde van Drenthe
 2nd Tour of Flanders
 3rd Overall UCI World Rankings
 3rd Overall UCI World Cup
 3rd Overall Tour of Qatar
 3rd Trofeo Alfredo Binda
 4th Open de Suède Vårgårda
 5th Holland Hills Classic
 6th Omloop Het Nieuwsblad
 6th Omloop van het Hageland
 6th Drentse 8 van Dwingeloo
 6th La Flèche Wallonne
 7th Durango-Durango Emakumeen Saria
2014
 1st Tour of Flanders
 EPZ Omloop van Borsele
1st Time trial
3rd Road race
 1st RaboRonde Heerlen
 2nd Time trial, National Championships
 2nd Chrono Champenois
 2nd Holland Hills Classic
 3rd Overall Holland Ladies Tour
1st Stage 1 (ITT)
 3rd Open de Suède Vårgårda TTT
 4th Overall Festival Luxembourgeois Elsy Jacobs
 4th Le Samyn
 7th Time trial, UCI World Championships
 7th Ronde van Drenthe World Cup
 8th Overall Energiewacht Tour
 8th Trofeo Alfredo Binda
 10th La Flèche Wallonne
2015
 European Games
1st  Time trial
4th Road race
 1st Time trial, EPZ Omloop van Borsele
 UCI World Championships
2nd  Team time trial
7th Time trial
10th Road race
 2nd Time trial, National Championships
 2nd Omloop Het Nieuwsblad
 2nd Gooik–Geraardsbergen–Gooik
 3rd Overall Tour of Qatar
1st Stage 2
 3rd Overall Holland Ladies Tour
 3rd Ronde van Drenthe
 4th Ronde van Overijssel
 6th Overall Energiewacht Tour
 8th Trofeo Alfredo Binda
 8th Holland Hills Classic
 8th Durango-Durango Emakumeen Saria
2016
 UCI World Championships
1st  Team time trial
2nd  Time trial
 1st  Time trial, UEC European Championships
 1st  Overall Energiewacht Tour
1st Stages 1 (TTT) & 4b (ITT)
 1st Open de Suède Vårgårda TTT
 2nd Overall Holland Ladies Tour
1st Stage 2 (TTT)
 3rd Overall Tour of Qatar
1st Stage 3
 3rd Overall Thüringen Rundfahrt
1st Stage 4 (ITT)
 3rd Chrono Champenois
 4th Time trial, Olympic Games
 5th Holland Hills Classic
 6th Tour of Flanders
 8th Gent–Wevelgem
 8th Diamond Tour
2017
 UCI World Championships
1st  Team time trial
5th Time trial
 1st  Time trial, UEC European Championships
 1st  Overall Healthy Ageing Tour
1st  Points classification
1st Stage 1a (ITT)
 1st Tour de Okinawa
 National Championships
2nd Time trial
5th Road race
 2nd Overall Thüringen Rundfahrt
 2nd Gooik–Geraardsbergen–Gooik
 3rd Overall Tour of Norway
1st Prologue
 3rd Overall Holland Ladies Tour
 4th Omloop Het Nieuwsblad
 4th Liège–Bastogne–Liège
 5th Overall The Women's Tour
 5th Crescent Vårgårda UCI Women's WorldTour
 6th Le Samyn
 8th Omloop van het Hageland
 10th Amstel Gold Race
2018
 1st  Time trial, UEC European Championships
 1st  Time trial, National Championships
 1st  Overall Madrid Challenge by La Vuelta
1st Stage 1 (TTT)
 1st Dwars door Vlaanderen
 1st Omloop van het Hageland
 1st Stage 1 (TTT) Giro Rosa
 2nd Overall Thüringen Rundfahrt
1st Stage 7 (ITT)
 2nd Overall Holland Ladies Tour
 UCI World Championships
3rd  Time trial
3rd  Team time trial
 5th Liège–Bastogne–Liège
 7th Tour of Flanders
 9th Strade Bianche
 10th Ronde van Drenthe
2019
 1st  Time trial, UEC European Championships
 1st Dwars door Vlaanderen
 1st Postnord UCI WWT Vårgårda West Sweden TTT
 2nd Time trial, National Championships
 2nd Overall Healthy Ageing Tour
1st Stage 4a (ITT)
 3rd Ronde van Drenthe
 5th Tour of Flanders
 6th Overall Thüringen Rundfahrt
1st Stage 5 (ITT)
 6th Drentse Acht van Westerveld
2020
 1st Stage 1 (TTT) Giro Rosa
 2nd  Time trial, UEC European Championships
 3rd  Time trial, UCI World Championships
 3rd Liège–Bastogne–Liège
 4th Overall Challenge by La Vuelta
 5th Omloop Het Nieuwsblad
 5th Le Samyn
 7th Durango-Durango Emakumeen Saria
 8th Three Days of Bruges–De Panne
2021
 UCI World Championships
1st  Time trial
2nd  Team relay
 UEC European Championships
1st  Road race
2nd  Time trial
 1st  Overall Healthy Ageing Tour
1st  Combination classification
1st Stage 2 (ITT)
 1st Stage 1 (TTT) Giro Rosa
 2nd Time trial, National Championships
 2nd Overall Belgium Tour
1st  Mountains classification
1st  Cobblestones classification
1st Prologue
 3rd Overall Holland Ladies Tour
 9th Dwars door Vlaanderen
 10th Strade Bianche
 10th Donostia San Sebastián Klasikoa
2022
 1st  Time trial, UCI World Championships
 1st  Time trial, National Championships
 1st  Overall Bloeizone Fryslân Tour
1st Stage 1 (ITT)
 1st  Overall BeNe Ladies Tour
1st Prologue & Stage 3b (ITT)
 2nd  Time trial, UEC European Championships
 4th Overall Setmana Ciclista Valenciana 
1st Stage 2 
 7th Paris–Roubaix

General classification results timeline

One-day race results timeline

Major championship results

Track

2008
 2nd Team pursuit, 2007–08 UCI Track Cycling World Cup Classics, Copenhagen

2009
 2008–09 UCI Track Cycling World Cup Classics, Copenhagen
1st Individual pursuit
1st Points race
2nd Team pursuit

2011
 1st Team pursuit, 2011–12 UCI Track Cycling World Cup, Astana
  Dutch National Record, 2010–11 UCI Track Cycling World Cup Classics (Team pursuit, 3:23.179)
  Dutch National Record, (Team pursuit, 3:21.550)

2012
  Dutch National Record, Olympic Games (Team pursuit, 3:20.013)

Major championship results

Sources:

National team pursuit records

The women's 3000 m team pursuit track cycling discipline was introduced at the 2007–08 track cycling season. The Dutch team consisting of Ellen van Dijk, Marlijn Binnendijk and Yvonne Hijgenaar rode the team pursuit for the first time at Round 4 at the 2007–08 UCI Track Cycling World Cup in Copenhagen in a time of 3:36.901 (49.792 km/h). They broke the record later that day. After have ridden the team pursuit for the first time, the record has been broken nine times. Van Dijk is the only woman who always has been part of the squad when a record was broken. The current record was settled during the 2012 Summer Olympics by Van Dijk, Kirsten Wild and Vera Koedooder in a time of 3:20.013 (53.996 km/h) on  4 August 2012. After the 2011–12 track cycling season the UCI changed the discipline into a 4000 m team pursuit with 4 riders.

Individual records

Sources:

Notes

References

Further reading
Jeanine Laudy, Jan Willem Verkiel,: Strijd in het vrouwenpeloton: de Giro door de ogen van Marianne Vos en Ellen van Dijk , Tirion Sport . The story of Ellen van Dijk and Marianne Vos of the 2011 Giro d'Italia Femminile.

External links 

  
 

1987 births
Living people
Dutch female cyclists
UCI Track Cycling World Champions (women)
Road racing cyclists
People from Woerden
Cyclists at the 2012 Summer Olympics
Cyclists at the 2016 Summer Olympics
Olympic cyclists of the Netherlands
UCI Road World Champions (women)
Dutch cycling time trial champions
Vrije Universiteit Amsterdam alumni
UCI Road World Championships cyclists for the Netherlands
Dutch cyclists at the UCI Track Cycling World Championships
European Games gold medalists for the Netherlands
Cyclists at the 2015 European Games
European Games medalists in cycling
Cyclists from Utrecht (province)
Sports scientists